Treubia scapanioides is a species of liverwort in the family Treubiaceae.  Until recently, the genus was placed in the order Metzgeriales. There are only 6 species in the genus Treubia. Five are native to Australasia but T. scapanioides is known only from Chile.

References

Treubiales